Jorge César Fortunato Célico (born 13 September 1964) is an Argentine retired football manager and former player who played as a goalkeeper.

Career
A Huracán youth player, Buenos Aires-born Célico was promoted to the first team in 1982, appearing once on the bench but being subsequently released. He spent the remainder of his career in the lower leagues before retiring in 1990.

After working as an assistant at Nueva Chicago and Almagro, Célico was appointed interim manager of his first club Huracán, after previously working in the club's youth setup. His maiden game in charge occurred on 1 September 2002, a 2–1 away win against River Plate.

On 10 March 2003, Célico took over Huracán for the second time, now in charge until the end of the season. After failing to avoid relegation, he subsequently moved abroad after being appointed Universidad Católica del Ecuador manager.

Célico moved to El Nacional in 2006, initially working with the youth setup. In 2008 he was appointed first team manager, but was relieved from his duties on 29 January 2009 after a 5–0 loss against Nacional.

On 13 March 2009, Célico was named Técnico Universitario manager. After suffering relegation, he left the club and returned to Universidad Católica, now working with the youth side.

On 21 September 2010, Célico was appointed manager of the main squad, seriously threatened with relegation. He again dropped a division at the end of the campaign, but remained in charge of the club for the following six seasons.

On 17 July 2017, Célico was named Ecuador under-20 manager. On 12 September, he replaced sacked Gustavo Quinteros at the helm of the full side.

Honours
Universidad Católica
 Ecuadorian Serie B: 2012

Ecuador U20
FIFA U-20 World Cup third place: 2019

References

External links

1961 births
Living people
Footballers from Buenos Aires
Argentine footballers
Association football goalkeepers
Argentine football managers
Club Atlético Huracán managers
C.D. Universidad Católica del Ecuador managers
C.D. El Nacional managers
Ecuador national football team managers
Barcelona S.C. managers
Argentine expatriate football managers
Argentine expatriate sportspeople in Ecuador